Warning is a 2015 Bangladeshi action thriller film directed by Shafi Uddin Shafi. The  cast includes Arifin Shuvoo, Mahiya Mahi, Rubel and Misha Sawdagor. It is produced under the banner of Maple Films. In the film, Arifin Shuvo plays the role of a kidnapper and Mahiya Mahi plays the role a journalist.

Plot
The film start with a special operation to rescue few child from
human traffickers. DCDB Murad Anti kidnapping Squad incharge. He help the rescue team and rescue these child. Meanwhile, a fax come to police station and it's inform that someone will kidnap Dr. Masud.
Police officers don't emphasize in this fax and someone kidnap Dr. Masud. Then the kidnapper want ransom. Then the police team hit upon a plan. They will arrest him when he will come to take ransom. The kidnapper come and pick up money then DCDB Murad chase him. Chasing him they enter to Channel X office. There he catch Jishan (Arifin Shuvoo). Jishan enquire about the kidnappers. At the same time there was showing in television that Dr. Masud is confessing all his iniquity.

After few days, a fax come again and inform that engineer Belal will be kidnapped. To know this police team ensure security of engineer Belal. But the kidnapper kidnap engineer Belal. But police team got actual image of kidnapper from CCTV footage and the kidnapper is reporter Jishan. Murad go to Jishan's house to catch him but he become able to flee from there with help of Trina.
Then Trina ask him why he did that. Jishan tell everything that he lost his father and sister in a
building destroy and he get a news about some poerson who is connected with this. He kidnap all of those person to take revenge.

Cast
 Arifin Shuvoo as Jishan
 Mahiya Mahi as Trina
 Rubel as DCDB Murad Hasan, Anti kidnapping Squad incharge
 Misha Sawdagor as Ustagar
 Kazi Hayat as Jishan's father
 Rebeka Rouf as Jishan's mother
 Shiba Shanu as Jahangir
 Abdullah Saki as Dr. Masud
 Abu Sayeed Khan as Engr. Belal
 Shimul Khan as Meraj
 Jadu Azad
 Pirzada Shahidul Harun as Channel Y's owner
 Sohel Rashid as Mr. Sazzad
 Chikon Ali as Mamun
 Sanko Panja
 Bipasha Kabir in special appearance

Production

Casting
Upon success of Agnee, Maple Films Limited announced the production of Warning with a similar ensemble cast, which includes Arifin Shuvoo, Mahiya Mahi and Misha Sawdagor, however the film has no connection with Agnee.

Location
The film is entirely shot in Bangladesh. Majority of the film was shot in Dhaka while a few scenes were captured in Cox's Bazzar and Sylhet. The music track "Facebook" and "Shono Tumi" was entirely shot in Cox's Bazzar. Approximately 10% of the film was shot in Thailand.

Release
Warning was scheduled to release on 9 January 2015. However, The release date was pushed forward to 1 May 2015 due to conflict with other events such as Bishwa Ijtema, and 2015 Cricket World Cup.

Music

Warnings soundtrack album includes six songs, lyrics were written by Kabir Bakul. Shouquat Ali Emon has composed all the tracks for the album. The track "Eto Kosto" was released on 8 December 2014. Track "Facebook" was released on 17 December 2014 and "Shono Tumi", sung by Shafin Ahmed was released on 24 December 2014.

Track listing

References

2015 films
2015 action thriller films
Bengali-language Bangladeshi films
Bangladeshi action thriller films
Films scored by Shawkat Ali Emon
2010s Bengali-language films
2015 directorial debut films